The Eugene Larks were a class-D minor league baseball, club based in Eugene, Oregon. The team played in Far West League and was an affiliate of the Pittsburgh Pirates in 1951. The team was preceded in Eugene by the 1904 Eugene Blues, who played in the Oregon State League. The Eugene Larks disbanded after the 1951 season. The city would be without a team until the Eugene Emeralds began play in 1955.

Season-by-season

References

Professional baseball teams in Oregon
Defunct baseball teams in Oregon
Sports in Eugene, Oregon
Pittsburgh Pirates minor league affiliates
1950 establishments in Oregon
Baseball teams established in 1950
Baseball teams disestablished in 1951
Defunct minor league baseball teams
1951 disestablishments in Oregon
Far West League teams